The Doo-Wops & Hooligans Tour was the first headlining concert tour by American singer and songwriter Bruno Mars. Launched in support of his 2010 debut studio album Doo-Wops & Hooligans, the tour was announced in October 2010 and included dates in North America, Europe, Asia, Oceania, the Caribbean and South America.

The tour began in the United States on November 16, 2010, before moving on to Europe and Oceania. In mid-April 2011, Mars joined Janelle Monáe for a co-headline tour of North America dubbed Hooligans in Wondaland. This tour ended in mid-June and the Doo-Wops & Hooligans tour resumed, alternating between North America and Europe over the next seven months. The tour ended in Brazil in January 2012.

The tour set list featured most of the songs from the Doo-Wops & Hooligans album, as well as two covers of songs by other artists on which Mars had been a featured vocalist, B.o.B's "Nothin' on You" and Travie McCoy's "Billionaire". It also typically featured four or more covers of older tracks, which differed from one concert to another. Among these were Barrett Strong's "Money (That's What I Want)", The White Stripes' "Seven Nation Army", Aaliyah's "Rock the Boat" and two Michael Jackson songs. On one of the tour's European legs, a song recently penned by Mars, "It Will Rain", was also performed, featuring guest artist Skylar Grey.

Mars's personal performances on the tour received high praise from some critics, who commended him for his professionalism, showmanship and singing, with several comparing his stage presence to that of Prince and/or Jackson. Critics were more divided on the overall impact of the show, with some very enthusiastic, while others were critical of some of the material or arrangements. The tour was nominated for a Pollstar award.

Background and development
On September 9, 2010, it was announced that Bruno Mars would promote his 2010 debut album Doo-Wops & Hooligans as the opening act for Maroon 5 and OneRepublic, on the fall leg of the Palm Trees & Power Lines Tour in North America. Afterwards, Mars joined Travie McCoy to co-headline a European tour, which ran from October 18 to November 3, 2010.

Mars performed the first dates of his headline concerts, The Doo-Wops & Hooligans Tour, in the United States from November 16 to November 30. On November 11, tickets for additional dates for the North America leg of the tour went on sale. Dates for Europe and Oceania were announced in January 2011.  The initial setlist included seven songs from the Doo-Wops & Hooligans album, plus an unreleased track and three covers.

In February 2011, a co-headlining tour between Mars and Janelle Monáe was announced, dubbed the Hooligans in Wondaland Tour. This tour was completed in North America in May and June 2011, after which the Doo-Wops and Hooligans tour resumed in July.

Concert summary

American rapper Donnis opened for the first leg of the North American tour. Alex Hepburn appeared at some of the European shows, while hip-hop duo Diafrix supported Mars in Australia. Mars performed with his band, the Hooligans, which consisted of Phillip Lawrence (backup vocals), Phredley Brown (keyboard), Jamareo Artis (bass), Eric Hernandez (drums), Kameron Whalum, Dwayne Dugger and James King (horns), and Kenji Chan (guitar). Mars wore a black suit and tie at some shows in the United Kingdom. He used a Fender Stratocaster guitar. The set for the tour was about 75 minutes long, and included rehearsed comedic interludes.

The concerts opened to the fanfare of Richard Strauss' symphonic tone poem Also sprach Zarathustra, heralding Mars's arrival on stage. This was evidently in homage to one of Mars' musical heroes, Elvis Presley, who used the same theme to open his 1973 comeback tour.

Mars would sometimes begin the concerts by playing an extended drum solo, before breaking into the first two numbers on the set list, "The Other Side" and "Top of The World", with Mars dancing to the latter. The third number was a mashup of Barrett Strong's "Money (That's What I Want)"—performed in "Beatlesque" style—and Travie McCoy's "Billionaire", a song on which Mars had been a featured vocalist on the commercial release. The fourth number was "Our First Time". In early concerts, this was followed by a mashup of Michael Jackson's" Billie Jean"—"comically" performed to the tune of Nirvana's "Smells Like Teen Spirit"—and The White Stripes' "Seven Nation Army". This mashup was later dropped in favor of "Runaway Baby".

In what one reviewer described as a high point of the concert, Mars would then perform a trio of songs: the ballad "Marry You", the novelty number "The Lazy Song", and the folksy "Count On Me", with the artist accompanying the latter on ukelele. Next on the setlist was originally a rendition of Mars's guest feature on B.o.B's "Nothin' on You", with Mars contributing one of the rap verses himself, but in later concerts, it was preceded by the addition to the setlist of "Liquor Store Blues".

Mars initially rounded off the concerts with a performance of "Just the Way You Are", and after leaving the stage, would return to perform his then-latest hit "Grenade" as an encore, with the live performance featuring the addition of "pumping beats". By mid-2011, the presentation of these two songs had been reversed, while for the encore, either a mashup of a shortened version of "Lighters" and "Talking to the Moon" was used, or a medley of two Michael Jackson songs, "Dirty Diana" and "Billie Jean", on which Mars showcased his guitar skills. Some concerts included additional numbers, such as Aaliyah's "Rock the Boat" or, on the European circuit, a recently-penned Mars's number, "It Will Rain", featuring American singer-songwriter Skylar Grey as guest artist.

Audiences were reportedly composed largely of women and girls in their early twenties or younger, but also included a fair proportion of young men, as well as older fans. Mars typically worked to establish a good rapport with his audiences; in one concert, for example, he dedicated a song to "one lucky girl", while another number was dedicated to "each and every" attendee. He strongly encouraged audience participation, treating some songs as a "back and forth" between audience and artist, or encouraging one side of the audience to compete for enthusiasm against the other. Even without prompting, audiences generally sang along with gusto.

Critical reception 

Mars's personal performances on the tour attracted high praise from some critics, who commended him for his professionalism, showmanship and singing. Several compared his stage presence to that of two of his musical inspirations, Prince and Michael Jackson. Critics were more divided on the overall impact of the show, with some very enthusiastic, while others were lukewarm about some of the material or arrangements.

Ara Jansen of The West Australian said Mars came across as "positively dangerous and devastatingly confident in his musical skin", and that the show itself was "one of the most creative and exciting displays of musical artistry seen in a long time." She went on to presciently describe Mars as "a superstar in the making". Lynn Olanoff of The Express-Times described the show as "fun, exciting and sexy", and complimented Mars on his "soaring tenor voice", which she thought was best highlighted on the ballads. Deanna Ramsay of The Jakarta Post similarly praised Mars's "superb vocal abilities" and "skilful falsetto", which in live performance she thought fully lived up to his studio recordings. She described Mars, with his mixed-race background, as "a good example of what a truly global star can look like, able to traverse boundaries and effecting a true likeability and charm while managing that delicate balance of wholesome schoolboy and rebellious hoodlum".

Neil McCormick of The Daily Telegraph said that while some of Mars's studio recordings, particularly his ballads, might lead one to dismiss him as a "cheesy featherweight", there was an unexpected "heat and intensity" to his live performance, which combined with "a swaggering musicality and showmanship", was "almost ludicrously entertaining." Gareth Grundy of The Guardian was less impressed by Mars than some of the other critics, conceding only that he made "a small amount of boy-next-door charm go some distance" and that there was "too much showbiz polish for the show to be souped-up karaoke". Jim Sullivan of the Boston Herald praised Mars for his "supple tenor voice" and "soulful" genre blending, but found some of the ballads "sappy".

Arrangements for songs on the tour setlist sometimes differed substantially from the studio versions. McCormick noted favorably that in the live performance, songs were "amped up, slowed down, and twisted around, so that even smouldering ballads can suddenly switch to percussive funk and power-chord rockers", with Mars "effortlessly" transitioning "from honey-dripping soul crooner to rock belter, while firing off sharp guitar solos." Some of these changes were, however, not always appreciated by critics, with Jansen complaining that Mar's voice was sometimes overpowered by the backing band, while Olanoff thought the addition of "pumping beats" to two of his biggest hits was not an improvement.

"Grenade", a song where the protagonist offers to perform various suicidal missions for love of his girl, was singled out for particular criticism, with McCormick finding it "whiny", while Nicki Escudero of the Phoenix New Times thought it an anticlimactic end to the concert, suggesting that the preceding number, "Just the Way You Are", would have made a more appropriate finale. Mars himself appears to have reached a similar conclusion, as the order of the two songs was switched in later performances.

Accolades
Mars earned a nomination for Best New Touring Artist at the Pollstar Awards in 2011.

Set lists
The set lists given below were performed in November 2010 and August 2011, respectively. The list evolved over the course of the tour, and sometimes included other numbers. These included Aaliyah's "Rock the Boat", a medley of Michael Jackson's "Dirty Diana" and "Billie Jean" (performed as an encore), and "It Will Rain", a song penned by Mars while on tour and performed by featured artist Skylar Grey. 

"The Other Side"
"Top of The World"
"Money (That's What I Want)" (Barrett Strong cover) / "Billionaire"
"Our First Time"
"Billie Jean" (Michael Jackson cover) / "Seven Nation Army" (The White Stripes cover)
"Marry You"
"The Lazy Song"
"Count on Me"
"Nothin' on You"
"Just the Way You Are"
Encore
"Grenade" 

"The Other Side"
"Top of The World"
"Money (That's What I Want)" / "Billionaire"
"Our First Time"
"Runaway Baby"
"Marry You"
"The Lazy Song"
"Count on Me"
"Liquor Store Blues"
"Nothin' on You"
"Grenade" 
"Just the Way You Are"
Encore
"Lighters"/ "Talking to the Moon"

Tour dates

Box office score data

Personnel
Credits adapted from several sources:

The Hooligans
 Bruno Mars – vocals
 Philip Lawrence – backup vocals
 Phredley Brown – keyboard
 Jamareo Artis – bass guitar 
 Eric Hernandez – drums 
 Kameron Whalum – trombone 
 Dwayne Dugger –  saxophone 
 James King – trumpet
 Kenji Chan – lead guitar

Management
 Shaun Hoffman – tour manager
 Marty Diamond – touring agent, for Paradigm 
 Matt Galle – touring agent, for Paradigm 
 Emma Banks – touring agent, for Creative Artist Agency (United Kingdom, Europe)
 Brandon Creed – personnel management, for Creed Company

Production
 James Berry – monitor engineer

Notes

References

2010 concert tours
2011 concert tours
2012 concert tours
Bruno Mars concert tours
Concert tours of Asia
Concert tours of Canada
Concert tours of Europe
Concert tours of North America
Concert tours of Oceania
Concert tours of the United Kingdom
Concert tours of the United States